Melanophryniscus dorsalis is a species of toad in the family Bufonidae which is endemic to the coastal Brazil. It is threatened by habitat loss. Its natural habitats are subtropical or tropical sand dunes and nearby areas. It breeds in temporary pools.

References

Dorsalis
Endemic fauna of Brazil
Amphibians of Brazil
Amphibians described in 1933